The 1978–79 Pittsburgh Penguins season was their 12th in the National Hockey League. They finished second in the Norris Division, qualifying for the Stanley Cup playoffs for the first time since 1977. Their regular season was a marked improvement over the previous season, from 68 to 85 points.

Regular season

Final standings

Schedule and results

|- style="background:#fcf;"
| 1 || Oct 11 || Toronto Maple Leafs || 3–2 || Pittsburgh Penguins || Civic Arena || 0–1–0 || 0
|- style="background:#fcf;"
| 2 || Oct 12 || Pittsburgh Penguins || 2–8 || Boston Bruins || Boston Garden || 0–2–0 || 0
|- style="background:#ffc;"
| 3 || Oct 14 || Boston Bruins || 4–4 || Pittsburgh Penguins || Civic Arena || 0–2–1 || 1
|- style="background:#fcf;"
| 4 || Oct 18 || New York Islanders || 5–3 || Pittsburgh Penguins || Civic Arena || 0–3–1 || 1
|- style="background:#fcf;"
| 5 || Oct 19 || Pittsburgh Penguins || 1–3 || Philadelphia Flyers || The Spectrum || 0–4–1 || 1
|- style="background:#cfc;"
| 6 || Oct 21 || Washington Capitals || 1–5 || Pittsburgh Penguins || Civic Arena || 1–4–1 || 3
|- style="background:#ffc;"
| 7 || Oct 25 || St. Louis Blues || 6–6 || Pittsburgh Penguins || Civic Arena || 1–4–2 || 4
|- style="background:#fcf;"
| 8 || Oct 28 || Atlanta Flames || 4–2 || Pittsburgh Penguins || Civic Arena || 1–5–2 || 4
|- style="background:#fcf;"
| 9 || Oct 29 || Pittsburgh Penguins || 2–3 || New York Rangers || Madison Square Garden (IV) || 1–6–2 || 4
|-

|- style="background:#fcf;"
| 10 || Nov 1 || Pittsburgh Penguins || 4–6 || Washington Capitals || Capital Centre || 1–7–2 || 4
|- style="background:#fcf;"
| 11 || Nov 3 || Pittsburgh Penguins || 0–2 || Atlanta Flames || Omni Coliseum || 1–8–2 || 4
|- style="background:#cfc;"
| 12 || Nov 4 || Detroit Red Wings || 3–7 || Pittsburgh Penguins || Civic Arena || 2–8–2 || 6
|- style="background:#cfc;"
| 13 || Nov 8 || Colorado Rockies || 3–6 || Pittsburgh Penguins || Civic Arena || 3–8–2 || 8
|- style="background:#ffc;"
| 14 || Nov 9 || Pittsburgh Penguins || 4–4 || Buffalo Sabres || Buffalo Memorial Auditorium || 3–8–3 || 9
|- style="background:#fcf;"
| 15 || Nov 11 || New York Rangers || 2–1 || Pittsburgh Penguins || Civic Arena || 3–9–3 || 9
|- style="background:#cfc;"
| 16 || Nov 16 || Pittsburgh Penguins || 6–3 || Vancouver Canucks || Pacific Coliseum || 4–9–3 || 11
|- style="background:#cfc;"
| 17 || Nov 18 || Pittsburgh Penguins || 3–1 || Los Angeles Kings || The Forum || 5–9–3 || 13
|- style="background:#fcf;"
| 18 || Nov 22 || Montreal Canadiens || 3–2 || Pittsburgh Penguins || Civic Arena || 5–10–3 || 13
|- style="background:#fcf;"
| 19 || Nov 23 || Pittsburgh Penguins || 4–8 || Montreal Canadiens || Montreal Forum || 5–11–3 || 13
|- style="background:#fcf;"
| 20 || Nov 25 || Philadelphia Flyers || 3–1 || Pittsburgh Penguins || Civic Arena || 5–12–3 || 13
|- style="background:#fcf;"
| 21 || Nov 26 || Pittsburgh Penguins || 2–8 || Toronto Maple Leafs || Maple Leaf Gardens || 5–13–3 || 13
|- style="background:#cfc;"
| 22 || Nov 29 || Washington Capitals || 3–5 || Pittsburgh Penguins || Civic Arena || 6–13–3 || 15
|-

|- style="background:#cfc;"
| 23 || Dec 1 || Pittsburgh Penguins || 7–4 || Washington Capitals || Capital Centre || 7–13–3 || 17
|- style="background:#cfc;"
| 24 || Dec 2 || Chicago Black Hawks || 2–5 || Pittsburgh Penguins || Civic Arena || 8–13–3 || 19
|- style="background:#ffc;"
| 25 || Dec 5 || Pittsburgh Penguins || 3–3 || New York Islanders || Nassau Veterans Memorial Coliseum || 8–13–4 || 20
|- style="background:#cfc;"
| 26 || Dec 6 || Toronto Maple Leafs || 4–6 || Pittsburgh Penguins || Civic Arena || 9–13–4 || 22
|- style="background:#ffc;"
| 27 || Dec 8 || Pittsburgh Penguins || 3–3 || Montreal Canadiens || Montreal Forum || 9–13–5 || 23
|- style="background:#ffc;"
| 28 || Dec 9 || Buffalo Sabres || 4–4 || Pittsburgh Penguins || Civic Arena || 9–13–6 || 24
|- style="background:#cfc;"
| 29 || Dec 13 || St. Louis Blues || 0–3 || Pittsburgh Penguins || Civic Arena || 10–13–6 || 26
|- style="background:#fcf;"
| 30 || Dec 14 || Pittsburgh Penguins || 1–2 || Philadelphia Flyers || The Spectrum || 10–14–6 || 26
|- style="background:#cfc;"
| 31 || Dec 16 || Vancouver Canucks || 5–6 || Pittsburgh Penguins || Civic Arena || 11–14–6 || 28
|- style="background:#ffc;"
| 32 || Dec 17 || Pittsburgh Penguins || 3–3 || Chicago Black Hawks || Chicago Stadium || 11–14–7 || 29
|- style="background:#cfc;"
| 33 || Dec 21 || Pittsburgh Penguins || 4–1 || Los Angeles Kings || The Forum || 12–14–7 || 31
|- style="background:#fcf;"
| 34 || Dec 23 || Pittsburgh Penguins || 3–5 || Minnesota North Stars || Met Center || 12–15–7 || 31
|- style="background:#cfc;"
| 35 || Dec 27 || Los Angeles Kings || 2–5 || Pittsburgh Penguins || Civic Arena || 13–15–7 || 33
|- style="background:#cfc;"
| 36 || Dec 30 || Detroit Red Wings || 1–3 || Pittsburgh Penguins || Civic Arena || 14–15–7 || 35
|- style="background:#cfc;"
| 37 || Dec 31 || Pittsburgh Penguins || 5–4 || Detroit Red Wings || Olympia Stadium || 15–15–7 || 37
|-

|- style="background:#fcf;"
| 38 || Jan 3 || Vancouver Canucks || 5–3 || Pittsburgh Penguins || Civic Arena || 15–16–7 || 37
|- style="background:#ffc;"
| 39 || Jan 5 || Pittsburgh Penguins || 3–3 || Atlanta Flames || Omni Coliseum || 15–16–8 || 38
|- style="background:#fcf;"
| 40 || Jan 6 || Los Angeles Kings || 4–3 || Pittsburgh Penguins || Civic Arena || 15–17–8 || 38
|- style="background:#cfc;"
| 41 || Jan 10 || Montreal Canadiens || 2–3 || Pittsburgh Penguins || Civic Arena || 16–17–8 || 40
|- style="background:#cfc;"
| 42 || Jan 13 || Boston Bruins || 3–5 || Pittsburgh Penguins || Civic Arena || 17–17–8 || 42
|- style="background:#cfc;"
| 43 || Jan 14 || Pittsburgh Penguins || 5–4 || Buffalo Sabres || Buffalo Memorial Auditorium || 18–17–8 || 44
|- style="background:#cfc;"
| 44 || Jan 16 || Minnesota North Stars || 0–5 || Pittsburgh Penguins || Civic Arena || 19–17–8 || 46
|- style="background:#fcf;"
| 45 || Jan 17 || Pittsburgh Penguins || 1–4 || Detroit Red Wings || Olympia Stadium || 19–18–8 || 46
|- style="background:#fcf;"
| 46 || Jan 20 || Washington Capitals || 5–2 || Pittsburgh Penguins || Civic Arena || 19–19–8 || 46
|- style="background:#fcf;"
| 47 || Jan 24 || Pittsburgh Penguins || 1–4 || Los Angeles Kings || The Forum || 19–20–8 || 46
|- style="background:#fcf;"
| 48 || Jan 25 || Pittsburgh Penguins || 3–5 || Colorado Rockies || McNichols Sports Arena || 19–21–8 || 46
|- style="background:#cfc;"
| 49 || Jan 27 || Los Angeles Kings || 3–5 || Pittsburgh Penguins || Civic Arena || 20–21–8 || 48
|- style="background:#fcf;"
| 50 || Jan 31 || Montreal Canadiens || 4–1 || Pittsburgh Penguins || Civic Arena || 20–22–8 || 48
|-

|- style="background:#cfc;"
| 51 || Feb 3 || Detroit Red Wings || 2–4 || Pittsburgh Penguins || Civic Arena || 21–22–8 || 50
|- style="background:#fcf;"
| 52 || Feb 4 || Pittsburgh Penguins || 3–8 || Detroit Red Wings || Olympia Stadium || 21–23–8 || 50
|- style="background:#cfc;"
| 53 || Feb 15 || Minnesota North Stars || 5–6 || Pittsburgh Penguins || Civic Arena || 22–23–8 || 52
|- style="background:#cfc;"
| 54 || Feb 17 || Buffalo Sabres || 3–6 || Pittsburgh Penguins || Civic Arena || 23–23–8 || 54
|- style="background:#fcf;"
| 55 || Feb 18 || Pittsburgh Penguins || 2–6 || Detroit Red Wings || Olympia Stadium || 23–24–8 || 54
|- style="background:#cfc;"
| 56 || Feb 21 || Montreal Canadiens || 1–3 || Pittsburgh Penguins || Civic Arena || 24–24–8 || 56
|- style="background:#fcf;"
| 57 || Feb 22 || Pittsburgh Penguins || 0–12 || Montreal Canadiens || Montreal Forum || 24–25–8 || 56
|- style="background:#cfc;"
| 58 || Feb 24 || Chicago Black Hawks || 1–5 || Pittsburgh Penguins || Civic Arena || 25–25–8 || 58
|- style="background:#ffc;"
| 59 || Feb 25 || Pittsburgh Penguins || 2–2 || Chicago Black Hawks || Chicago Stadium || 25–25–9 || 59
|- style="background:#cfc;"
| 60 || Feb 28 || Colorado Rockies || 3–5 || Pittsburgh Penguins || Civic Arena || 26–25–9 || 61
|-

|- style="background:#fcf;"
| 61 || Mar 3 || Pittsburgh Penguins || 4–8 || St. Louis Blues || The Checkerdome || 26–26–9 || 61
|- style="background:#cfc;"
| 62 || Mar 4 || Pittsburgh Penguins || 7–2 || Colorado Rockies || McNichols Sports Arena || 27–26–9 || 63
|- style="background:#fcf;"
| 63 || Mar 7 || Los Angeles Kings || 4–0 || Pittsburgh Penguins || Civic Arena || 27–27–9 || 63
|- style="background:#cfc;"
| 64 || Mar 10 || Philadelphia Flyers || 2–3 || Pittsburgh Penguins || Civic Arena || 28–27–9 || 65
|- style="background:#fcf;"
| 65 || Mar 11 || Pittsburgh Penguins || 0–4 || Toronto Maple Leafs || Maple Leaf Gardens || 28–28–9 || 65
|- style="background:#cfc;"
| 66 || Mar 13 || Pittsburgh Penguins || 9–3 || Vancouver Canucks || Pacific Coliseum || 29–28–9 || 67
|- style="background:#ffc;"
| 67 || Mar 14 || Pittsburgh Penguins || 3–3 || Los Angeles Kings || The Forum || 29–28–10 || 68
|- style="background:#cfc;"
| 68 || Mar 17 || Pittsburgh Penguins || 5–2 || Washington Capitals || Capital Centre || 30–28–10 || 70
|- style="background:#cfc;"
| 69 || Mar 18 || Pittsburgh Penguins || 5–1 || New York Rangers || Madison Square Garden (IV) || 31–28–10 || 72
|- style="background:#ffc;"
| 70 || Mar 21 || Washington Capitals || 2–2 || Pittsburgh Penguins || Civic Arena || 31–28–11 || 73
|- style="background:#cfc;"
| 71 || Mar 22 || Pittsburgh Penguins || 3–1 || Boston Bruins || Boston Garden || 32–28–11 || 75
|- style="background:#ffc;"
| 72 || Mar 24 || Pittsburgh Penguins || 3–3 || New York Islanders || Nassau Veterans Memorial Coliseum || 32–28–12 || 76
|- style="background:#ffc;"
| 73 || Mar 25 || New York Islanders || 2–2 || Pittsburgh Penguins || Civic Arena || 32–28–13 || 77
|- style="background:#cfc;"
| 74 || Mar 27 || Pittsburgh Penguins || 5–1 || Minnesota North Stars || Met Center || 33–28–13 || 79
|- style="background:#cfc;"
| 75 || Mar 28 || New York Rangers || 1–7 || Pittsburgh Penguins || Civic Arena || 34–28–13 || 81
|- style="background:#fcf;"
| 76 || Mar 31 || Pittsburgh Penguins || 3–5 || Montreal Canadiens || Montreal Forum || 34–29–13 || 81
|-

|- style="background:#fcf;"
| 77 || Apr 1 || Atlanta Flames || 7–2 || Pittsburgh Penguins || Civic Arena || 34–30–13 || 81
|- style="background:#cfc;"
| 78 || Apr 3 || Pittsburgh Penguins || 3–2 || St. Louis Blues || The Checkerdome || 35–30–13 || 83
|- style="background:#cfc;"
| 79 || Apr 7 || Detroit Red Wings || 3–4 || Pittsburgh Penguins || Civic Arena || 36–30–13 || 85
|- style="background:#fcf;"
| 80 || Apr 8 || Pittsburgh Penguins || 2–5 || Washington Capitals || Capital Centre || 36–31–13 || 85
|-

|- style="text-align:center;"
| Legend:       = Win       = Loss       = Tie

Playoffs

Preliminary Round vs. Buffalo

Quarterfinals vs. Boston

Player statistics
Skaters

Goaltenders

†Denotes player spent time with another team before joining the Penguins.  Stats reflect time with the Penguins only.
‡Denotes player was traded mid-season.  Stats reflect time with the Penguins only.

Transactions

The Penguins were involved in the following transactions during the 1978–79 season:

Trades

Additions and subtractions

Draft picks 

The 1978 NHL Entry Draft was held on June 15, 1978, in Montreal, Quebec.

References
 Penguins on Hockey Database

Pittsburgh Penguins seasons
Pittsburgh
Pittsburgh
Pitts
Pitts